Daniel Moradei de Almeida, or simply Moradei (born February 8, 1986 in São Luís do Paraitinga), is a Brazilian defensive midfielder who plays for São Caetano in the Brazilian Série B.

Career
Formed in the basic categories of Esporte Clube Taubaté, where he made his professional debut in 2005, stood out Moradei Bragantino, where he made an excellent Championship in 2007. He was contracted to Bragantino from 10 January 2007 to 31 December 2007, although from 28 May 2007 was loaned to Corinthians.

Although the team Bragantino was the highlight of Pauistão 2007, was disqualified by Santos coach Vanderlei Luxemburgo, who became champion of the competition, and managed two draws in the semifinal without conceding, that favored the alvinegro that beachy played by two equal outcomes for having done better in the qualifying campaign.

The team of Bragança Paulista 2007 was mooted several players to be contracted by teams considered "large" and five, nearly half a team, were hired by the Corinthians, one Moradei. Along with housing, arrived at the Parque São Jorge three players, defender Zela, goalkeeper Felipe and attacking midfielder Everton Santos.

With the fall of the Corinthians for the series B do Brasileirão, the management team decided not to renew his contract with Moradei it comes back to the cast of Bragantino in 2008 to compete in the Championship.

In 2009 a player hit his return to the Corinthians, this time purchased in the final. At the press conference, players cried, as reminded of the sad year of 2007, which in addition to lowering the Corinthians, his wife passed, pregnant, on a serious surgery. He also revealed that the club is wishing for since I was a child .

In 2010, he played for Sao Caetano on loan from Corinthians.

In 2011, he returned to Corinthians.

Career statistics
(Correct )

Contract
 São Caetano.CBF

References

External links
 ogol.com
 globoesporte
 Moradei é apresentado oficialmente pelo Corinthians
 Guardian Stats Centre
 zerozero.pt
 CBF
 Moradei é apresentado oficialmente pelo Corinthians

1986 births
People from São Luiz do Paraitinga
Living people
Brazilian footballers
Esporte Clube Taubaté players
Ituano FC players
Clube Atlético Bragantino players
Sport Club Corinthians Paulista players
Associação Desportiva São Caetano players
Association football midfielders